Michael Eneramo  (born 26 November 1985) is a Nigerian former professional footballer who played as a striker.

Club career
Eneramo began his career with Lobi Stars and was in 2004 scouted by Tunisian top club Espérance Sportive de Tunis, he was then loaned to USM Alger from 2004 through 2006, where he scored 13 goals in the Algerian Championnat National. Eneramo won the Double in 2007 with Espérance de Tunis and joined Saudi Arabian club Al-Shabab on loan in July 2007 before returning in December the same year.

On 19 January 2011, Eneramo joined Turkish side Sivasspor on a one-and-a-half-year deal. After two seasons with Sivasspor he was transferred to Beşiktaş and then loaned to Karabükspor for the 2013–14 season. During the 2014–15 season he was joined İstanbul Başakşehir F.K. on a free transfer.

International career
In 2008, Eneramo considered accepting Tunisian citizenship in order to become eligible to play for the Tunisia national team. He was called up to the Nigeria national team in 2009 and played his first game on 11 February 2009. In his second game with the Super Eagles, he scored the opening goal against the Republic of Ireland.

References

External links
 Eneramo a Super Eagle After All?
 Last Yigido Michael Eneramo
 

1985 births
Living people
Sportspeople from Kaduna
Nigerian footballers
Association football forwards
Nigeria international footballers
Espérance Sportive de Tunis players
Lobi Stars F.C. players
USM Alger players
Sivasspor footballers
Beşiktaş J.K. footballers
Kardemir Karabükspor footballers
Ettifaq FC players
Süper Lig players
Saudi Professional League players
Tunisian Ligue Professionnelle 1 players
Nigerian expatriate footballers
Nigerian expatriate sportspeople in Tunisia
Expatriate footballers in Tunisia
Nigerian expatriate sportspeople in Algeria
Expatriate footballers in Algeria
Nigerian expatriate sportspeople in Saudi Arabia
Expatriate footballers in Saudi Arabia
Nigerian expatriate sportspeople in Turkey
Expatriate footballers in Turkey
Nigerian expatriate sportspeople in Cyprus
Expatriate footballers in Cyprus